Lindsay Earle Hartwig (29 December 1919 – 2 April 1996) was a politician in Queensland, Australia. He was a Member of the Queensland Legislative Assembly.

Early life
Hartwig was a farmer and grazier by occupation and pioneered the first aerial sowing of pasture seed.

Politics
Hartwig began his political career as a councillor with the Shire of Monto (1961–1970) and was appointed chairman in 1964.

In 1972, he was preselected for the safe National Party seat of Callide. He was elected at the 1972 election, winning re-election as a National in 1974, 1977 and 1980. In 1981, Hartwig was expelled from the National Party caucus by a vote of 33 to 2 by the party executive for repeated criticism of party president Sir Robert Sparkes. He won re-election as an independent in 1983, but retired at the 1986 election. During his time as an independent, he was elected as the Chairman of the Livingstone Shire Council in a landslide. However, he only served about 11 months as chairman because of continual concerns about his ability to be effective as a shire chairman given his parliamentary duties.

Hartwig was never appointed to state Cabinet but had a notable achievement in fighting successfully to have Queensland Day officially recognised. He also adopted a unique radio campaign. He put together a race-call commercial and called himself "Lovable Lindsay" who always won by a nose.

After leaving Parliament he became involved with the Liberal Party for a time and contested the 1988 South-Coast by-election for the fringe right-wing Citizens Electoral Council.

Later life
Upon his death in 1996, his former colleagues made a range of tribute speeches; the stories of Hartwig's career were frequently humorous. Hartwig is buried in Toowoomba's Garden of Remembrance Cemetery.

References

 Parliament of Queensland Hansard 16 April 1996
 Parliament of Queensland Register

                   

1919 births
1996 deaths
Members of the Queensland Legislative Assembly
Independent members of the Parliament of Queensland
National Party of Australia members of the Parliament of Queensland
20th-century Australian politicians
Australian Citizens Party politicians